Bardaskan (also Romanized as Badar Askān, Badr Eshkand, Bardāskan, Bardāskand, Bardeshkand and Bardeskan) is a city and capital of Bardaskan County, in Razavi Khorasan Province, Iran.
  Bardaskan used to be part of Kashmar city

Geographical position, weather, jobs, products and roads

Bardaskan is located in the Khorasan Razavi province at the margin of the north part of Namak Desert (salt desert). Its area is 8535 km2. Altitude of Bardaskan is 985 meter. The weather in the north part of Bardaskan is cold and in the south and central parts changes from semi dry to hot and dry. Annual raining average is 150 mm. Bardaskan's temperature in the hottest summer day is nearly 45 °C And in the coldest winter night is -5 °C. There in not any permanent river in the Bardaskan but there are several seasonal rivers. Main jobs in Bardaskan are farming and animal husbandry. Staple crops in Bardaskan are wheat, barley, ccotton umin seed, and pistachio, Saffron, pomegranate, fig and grape products. Neighboring cities by Bardaskan are sabzevar and neishabuor (in the North) kashmar (in the east) Tabas (in the south) and Semnan (in the west).

Location 
Bardeskan city is located between 56 degrees and 14 minutes to 58 degrees and 15 minutes of longitude and 34 degrees and 42 minutes of latitude.  the city of Bardeskan is located in the west of Mashhad. The height of this city is 985 meters above sea level.

Historical sites, ancient artifacts and tourism

Sir Cave 

Sir Cave is a cave in Sir village of the Central District of Bardaskan County in Razavi Khorasan Province. The cave was inhabited in the past and was used as a shelter. Sir Cave is located on a rocky mountain with a height of about 80 meters and about 1608 meters above sea level. It is difficult to reach.

Rahmanniyeh Castle 

Rahmanniyeh Castle is a historical castle located in Bardaskan County in Razavi Khorasan Province, The longevity of this fortress dates back to the 8th to 12th centuries AH.

Qal'eh Dokhtar, Khooshab 

Qaleh Dokhtar is a historical castle located in Bardaskan County in Razavi Khorasan Province, The longevity of this fortress dates back to the 6th to 8th centuries AH.

Qal'eh Dokhtar, Doruneh 

Qal'eh Dokhtar is a historical castle located in Bardaskan County in Razavi Khorasan Province, The longevity of this fortress dates back to the 6th to 9th centuries AH.

Aliabad Tower 

This tower is located in Aliabad-e Keshmar, 42 km from Kashmar city. This tower is built on the castle and its minaret is similar to the tower and its facade is made of decorative brick inlay. This dome is 18 meters. Tall with an octagonal interior. This tower is in the historical records.

Firuzabad Tower 

This minaret is made of brick and there are inscriptions on it called "Kufic" which dates back to the late 7th century AH. Although the minaret is made of simple brick - the bricks are laid in a zigzag pattern to enhance its beauty. Inside the minaret, the remains of a staircase can be seen and holes are inscribed on the minaret. Currently, this minaret is 18 meters high.

Seyyed Bagher Ab anbar 

The Seyed Bagher Ab anbar is a historical Ab anbar of Qajar dynasty that is located in city center of Bardaskan, in Ghaem Avenue. This Ab anbar was added to the list of National Monuments of Iran As the 11034st monument.

Firuzabad area 

The Firuzabad area is a historical area related to the Pre-Islamic period and is located in Bardaskan County, Central District, Firuzabad village.

Darone Cave 

Darone Cave is a cave in Bardaskan County, Iran. It is located in Cave Doruneh, Bardaskan.

Ribat of Kabudan 

Ribat of Kabudan is a historical Ribat related to the Qajar dynasty and is located in Kabudan, Razavi Khorasan Province.

Tomb of Abdolabad 

The Tomb of Abdolabad is a historical tomb and chahartaqi of Ilkhanate era in Abdolabad village at Bardaskan County.The tomb was added to the list of National Monuments of Iran as the 10,908th monument.

Gallery

See also 

 List of cities, towns and villages in Razavi Khorasan Province

References

External links

Photos of Bardaskan

 
Populated places in Bardaskan County
Cities in Razavi Khorasan Province
Cities in Bardaskan County